Lee Myung-joo (born 24 April 1990) is a South Korean footballer who plays as a midfielder.

Club career

Pohang Steelers 
After a debut season with the Pohang Steelers, Lee was named as the K-League Rookie of the Year for 2012. In the 2013 season, he scored eight goals to contribute to Pohang's domestic league and cup double success. His performances were rewarded with his inclusion in the K League Classic Best XI for the 2013 season.

Al Ain 
On 9 June 2014, Lee joined Al Ain FC, signing a three-year contract.

FC Seoul 
On 19 June 2017, Lee joined FC Seoul, signing a six-month contract.

International career 
Lee made his debut for the South Korean national team on 11 June 2013 in a win against Uzbekistan in the 2014 FIFA World Cup qualification.

International goals
Scores and results list South Korea's goal tally first.

Club career statistics

Honours

Club

 Pohang Steelers
 K League 1 (1): 2013
 Korean FA Cup (2): 2012, 2013

 Al Ain
 UAE Arabian Gulf League (1): 2014–15
 UAE Super Cup (1): 2015

 Asan Mugunghwa
 K League 2 (1): 2018

International

South Korea
 EAFF East Asian Cup (1): 2017

Individual
 K-League Rookie of the Year Award: 2012
 K League 1 Best XI: 2013
 K League 2 Best XI: 2018

References

External links 
 
 Lee Myung-joo – National Team stats at KFA 

1990 births
Living people
Sportspeople from Daegu
South Korean footballers
Association football midfielders
South Korea under-23 international footballers
South Korea international footballers
South Korean expatriate footballers
Pohang Steelers players
Al Ain FC players
FC Seoul players
Asan Mugunghwa FC players
Al Wahda FC players
K League 1 players
K League 2 players
UAE Pro League players
2015 AFC Asian Cup players
South Korean expatriate sportspeople in the United Arab Emirates
Expatriate footballers in the United Arab Emirates